Albert Gallatin Jewett (November 27, 1802 – April 4, 1885) was the American Chargé d'affaires to Peru from 1845 through 1847, under the administration of President James K. Polk.

Born in Pittston, Maine in 1802 and a graduate of Colby College in Waterville, Jewett practiced law in Bangor, Maine from 1829 until leaving for Peru in 1845.  He served as Penobscot County Attorney at the height of Bangor's prosperity as a lumber port, and built one of the city's largest Italianate-style houses (the Jewett-Stetson Mansion, since demolished) in what is now the Broadway Historic District.  After serving two years representing the United States in Peru 1845 – 47, Jewett toured Europe and eventually returned to re-settle in Belfast, Maine, south of Bangor, where he was elected mayor three times in the 1860s.

References

History of Penobscot County, Maine (Cleveland, 1882), p. 211

1802 births
1885 deaths
Ambassadors of the United States to Peru
People from Bangor, Maine
People from Belfast, Maine
People from Pittston, Maine
Colby College alumni
Mayors of places in Maine
19th-century American diplomats
County district attorneys in Maine